Santópolis do Aguapeí is a municipality in the state of São Paulo in Brazil. The population is 4,817 (2020 est.) in an area of 128 km². The elevation is 429 m.

References

Municipalities in São Paulo (state)